Gaétan Turcotte (10 December 1954 – 20 March 2022) was a Canadian water polo player. He competed in the men's tournament at the 1976 Summer Olympics and won the bronze medal  at the 1979 Pan American Games.

References

External links
 

1954 births
2022 deaths
Canadian male water polo players
Olympic water polo players of Canada
Water polo players at the 1976 Summer Olympics
Water polo players from Quebec City